Thành Thái (14 March 1879 – 20 March 1954)  born Nguyễn Phúc Bửu Lân (阮福寶嶙), was the son of Emperor Dục Đức and Empress Dowager Từ Minh. He reigned as emperor for 18 years, from 1889 to 1907.

Biography

Early life
While the emperor Tự Đức was alive, Prince Quang Thái was placed under house arrest with his family for having connections with those who opposed him. When the emperor Đồng Khánh died, however, the French colonial authorities and the high-ranking mandarins decided that Quang Thái was the ideal successor and enthroned him as the new Vietnamese emperor, Emperor Thành Thái.

At the age of 10, Thành Thái was recognized as being very intelligent and was already realizing that the French were keeping watch over him through palace spies. Whereas Đồng Khánh had tried to be friendly with the French, Emperor Thành Thái took a course of passive-resistance. Although he refrained from outright rebellion (which would have been political suicide), he made his feelings clear in other ways, symbolic gestures and biting remarks. He was also a man of the people, and a monarch who cared deeply for his country. The emperor would often slip out of the Forbidden City dressed in the clothes of a commoner to talk with his people directly and see how they were being affected by government policies.

Opposing French authority
To show that he was friendly with Western civilization, Thành Thái was the first Vietnamese monarch to cut his hair in the French style and learn to drive a car. He encouraged French-style education, but maintained bitter feelings over their control of his country. He also supported numerous building projects and took an interest in the everyday lives of his subjects. When traveling among his people, he would hold impromptu "town hall meetings" where the Emperor sat on a mat with his subjects in a circle around him, discussing the issues of the day and hearing their point of view.

Slowly, as the emperor began to realize how thoroughly his palace had been infiltrated with French spies, he had to feign insanity to escape their constant scrutiny. With his enemies believing he was a harmless lunatic, Thành Thái was able to push more forcefully for Vietnamese autonomy while waiting for the right time to overthrow the French colonial rule. He was on his way to join a resistance movement in China when he was arrested by French forces who declared him insane and forced the Emperor to abdicate.

In 1907, his son was installed as Emperor Duy Tân. Thành Thái was exiled first to Vũng Tàu in South Vietnam and when Duy Tân rebelled against the French they were both exiled to Réunion Island in 1916. 

Unlike Hàm Nghi, the lives of Thành Thái and Duy Tân were tough. They even had no money to pay for rent. In 1925, Emperor Khải Định knew his situation and sent 1,000 piastres to him. Khải Định later occasionally gave him money.

He never gave up hope for the liberation of his country. In 1945, just after the death of Duy Tân, he was allowed to return home, but was kept under house arrest in Vũng Tàu. He died in Saigon on 24 March 1954 and was buried on the grounds of An Lang (Tomb of Duc Duc) in an old commune, Hương Thủy district, Thừa Thiên Huế Province, at the age of 75.

Honours
Grand Cross of the Legion of Honour of France – 1883
Grand Cross of the Royal Order of Cambodia – 1889

Cabinet

Gallery

References

External link 

 
 

1869 births
1969 deaths
Vietnamese nationalists
Vietnamese revolutionaries
Nguyen dynasty emperors
Dethroned monarchs
19th-century Vietnamese monarchs
Vietnamese monarchs